The Exobasidiomycetes are a class of fungi sometimes associated with the abnormal outgrowths of plant tissues known as galls. The class includes Exobasidium camelliae Shirai, the camellia leaf gall and Exobasidium vaccinii Erikss, the leaf and flower gall. There are eight orders in the Exobasidiomycetes, including the Ceraceosorales, Doassansiales, Entylomatales, Exobasidiales, Georgefischeriales, Malasseziales, Microstromatales and the Tilletiales. Four of the eight orders include smut fungi. The families Ceraceosoraceae and Malasseziaceae were formally validated in 2009 for the orders Ceraceosorales and Malasseziales, respectively.

References

External links
Forestry Images - Exobasidiomycetes

Ustilaginomycotina
Fungus classes
Taxa described in 2007